West Seneca is a hamlet and census-designated place (CDP) in Erie County, New York, United States. The population was 44,711 at the 2010 census. It is part of the Buffalo–Niagara Falls Metropolitan Statistical Area. The CDP corresponds exactly to the area of the town of West Seneca.

Geography

Demographics
At the 2000 census there were 45,943 people, 18,337 households, and 12,744 families living in the CDP.  The population density was 2,148.6 per square mile (829.7/km).  There were 18,993 housing units at an average density of 888.2/sq mi (343.0/km).  The racial makeup of the CDP was 98.11% White, 0.46% Black or African American, 0.17% Native American, 0.50% Asian, 0.01% Pacific Islander, 0.19% from other races, and 0.56% from two or more races. Hispanic or Latino of any race were 0.88%.

Of the 18,337 households 28.2% had children under the age of 18 living with them, 56.2% were married couples living together, 10.3% had a female householder with no husband present, and 30.5% were non-families. 26.6% of households were one person and 13.1% were one person aged 65 or older.  The average household size was 2.47 and the average family size was 3.02.

The age distribution was 22.3% under the age of 18, 6.9% from 18 to 24, 27.2% from 25 to 44, 25.4% from 45 to 64, and 18.2% 65 or older.  The median age was 41 years. For every 100 females, there were 91.0 males.  For every 100 females age 18 and over, there were 88.3 males.

The median household income was $46,264 and the median family income  was $54,164. Males had a median income of $39,003 versus $26,846 for females. The per capita income for the CDP was $20,529.  About 3.0% of families and 4.6% of the population were below the poverty line, including 5.1% of those under age 18 and 4.7% of those age 65 or over.

References

Census-designated places in New York (state)
Hamlets in New York (state)
Buffalo–Niagara Falls metropolitan area
Census-designated places in Erie County, New York
Hamlets in Erie County, New York